Val-d'Ornain is a commune in the Meuse department in Grand Est in north-eastern France.

The commune was formed by the fusion of the three villages of Mussey, Bussy-la-Côte and Varney in 1973.

See also
Communes of the Meuse department

References

Valdornain